Peradon is a genus of hoverfly from the Neotropical realm, containing 31 species. Many of the species were originally described in the genus Microdon.

Species
Species in Peradon include:

 Peradon angustiventris (Macquart, 1855)
 Peradon angustus (Macquart, 1846)
 Peradon aureoscutus (Hull, 1943)
 Peradon aureus (Hull, 1944)
 Peradon aurifascia (Hull, 1944)
 Peradon aurigaster (Hull, 1941)
 Peradon ballux Reemer in Reemer, Skevington & Kelso, 2019
 Peradon bidens (Fabricius, 1805)
 Peradon bispina (Hull, 1943)
 Peradon brevis Reemer in Reemer, Skevington & Kelso, 2019
 Peradon chrysopygus (Giglio-Tos, 1892)
 Peradon costaricensis Reemer in Reemer, Skevington & Kelso, 2019
 Peradon diaphanus (Sack, 1921)
 Peradon elongata (Hull, 1943)
 Peradon fenestratus (Hull, 1943)
 Peradon flavipennis (Curran, 1925)
 Peradon flavofascium (Curran, 1925)
 Peradon hermetia (Curran, 1936)
 Peradon hermetoides (Curran, 1940)
 Peradon luridescens (Walker, 1857)
 Peradon niger (Williston, 1891)
 Peradon normalis (Curran, 1925)
 Peradon notialus Reemer in Reemer, Skevington & Kelso, 2019
 Peradon oligonax (Hull, 1944)
 Peradon palpator Reemer in Reemer, Skevington & Kelso, 2019
 Peradon pompiloides Reemer in Reemer, Skevington & Kelso, 2019
 Peradon satyricus Reemer, 2014
 Peradon sciarus Reemer, 2014
 Peradon surinamensis Reemer in Reemer, Skevington & Kelso, 2019
 Peradon trilinea (Hull, 1943)
 Peradon trivittatum (Curran, 1925)

The following are synonyms of other species:
 Peradon flavomarginatum (Curran, 1925): synonym of Peradon bidens (Fabricius, 1805)
 Peradon langi (Curran, 1925): synonym of Peradon bidens (Fabricius, 1805)

References

Hoverfly genera
Diptera of South America
Microdontinae